Tobias Willers (born April 21, 1987) is a German football official and a former player. He works as a scout for FC Bayern Munich. He was before his arrival to FC Viktoria Köln suspended from professional football in Germany until November 2017.

Career
In June 2013, he signed for 3. Liga side RB Leipzig. He moved to VfL Osnabrück on 1 September 2014.

References

External links

1987 births
Living people
People from Hildesheim (district)
German footballers
Hannover 96 II players
Hannover 96 players
KSV Hessen Kassel players
Wuppertaler SV players
Sportfreunde Lotte players
Rot-Weiß Oberhausen players
RB Leipzig players
VfL Osnabrück players
3. Liga players
Association football central defenders
Footballers from Lower Saxony